Havøysund is the administrative centre of the Måsøy Municipality in Troms og Finnmark county, Norway. The village is located on the small island of Havøya, but is connected to the mainland by the Havøysund Bridge.

Havøysund is a fishing village which offers a generally wide range of common services.  There are fish processing factories, a boat yard, a petrol station, doctors, Havøysund Church, various shops, a sports hall, and museums. Havøysund also has a varied and lovely architecture; all the way along the beach one finds post-war houses, the so-called  (the houses built after World War II all had the same design). Up in the valley, there are more houses that were built in later decades after the war.

Måsøy Museum is located in Havøysund. The museum was established in a building that was originally built as a rectory. The collection of items consists of tools and technical equipment as used by fishermen through the 1900s. Additionally, several fixed exhibitions such as a kitchen, living room, schoolhouse, and line baiting booth.

The local supermarket is part of the Coop Prix chain, a subsidiary of the Coop company (similar to the Tesco Extra of Tesco in the United Kingdom).

Transportation
Havøysund Bridge is part of Norwegian County Road 889 which connects Havøysund to the mainland. The bridge was opened in 1986 by the late King Olav. This road is a national tourist route. That airport has flights to Tromsø with connecting flights to Oslo. Havøysund is also a stop on the Hurtigruten coastal express, between the towns of Hammerfest and Honningsvåg.

Media gallery

References

External links

Villages in Finnmark
Populated places of Arctic Norway
Måsøy